Are You Ready is the second studio album by the British pop group Bucks Fizz. It was released on 26 April 1982 and features the UK No. 1 singles "The Land of Make Believe" and "My Camera Never Lies" as well as the follow-up "Now Those Days Are Gone". It was produced by Andy Hill and released on RCA records. It remains the group's most successful album.

Overview

Background 
By the end of 1981, Bucks Fizz had proved that they were not destined to be another one-off Eurovision act by cracking the UK Top 20 with their first three singles and their debut album. In November, the group released the first single from their forthcoming second album. "The Land of Make Believe" became a big hit over Christmas 1981 and in the early weeks of January made number one in the UK Charts. The record eventually outsold "Making Your Mind Up" to become their biggest selling single in the UK.

Buoyed by this success, the group concentrated on recording the second album. A second single was released in March 1982, entitled "My Camera Never Lies". Well regarded in the press for its production values and intricate vocals, the song also made number one in the UK Charts. This became the peak of the group's career, bolstered by an award for best group at the Daily Mirror Rock and Pop Awards and a nomination at the Brit Awards.

The album was recorded during late 1981 and early 1982 at Mayfair Studios in London. Like the previous album, Are You Ready was produced by Andy Hill, who complimented the group on their ability to effortlessly adapt to the intricate harmonies and overlaying vocals on many of the tracks.  For the cover of the album, the group employed a parachuting theme. The front depicts them wearing parachuting gear in an aeroplane; the gatefold sleeve opens out to show them flying through the air, while the back reveals a silhouette of them having landed. This was the idea of the art director, but the group themselves told him that they thought it was "very naff".

Chart performance 
Are You Ready was released at the end of April and entered the UK charts at No.11 on 8 May 1982. The following week it rose to No.10, making it their first (and only) top ten album. After dropping down the chart it later rose up again as far as No.11 on the back of the third single. It remained on the chart for 23 weeks and was No.61 in the end of year album chart. It was certified gold by the BPI on 17 May for sales of over 100,000. Outside of the UK, the album reached No.18 in New Zealand, No.25 in Netherlands and No.61 in Germany. It remains Bucks Fizz's most successful album and was met by positive reviews.

A third single, "Now Those Days Are Gone" was released from the album a month later. Seen as something of a departure for the group, it was largely an a cappella ballad and also became successful in the UK Charts when it duly made the top 10. No further singles were issued from the album after this, although some European countries released album tracks "Easy Love" (Nº 11 in Denmark) and "Are You Ready" as singles – the latter also being released in Australia. In Japan the track "Another Night" was issued following its receiving a Best Song award in the World Popular Song Festival, held in Tokyo. The group also recorded many of the songs from this album in Spanish for the Latin American market and released an album, El Mundo de Ilusion later in the year.

The album was re-issued three times. The first time in 2000, again in 2004, and in a 2-CD edition in 2015, all times with bonus tracks. In 2006, a demo of track "Breaking and Entering" and alternate versions of "My Camera Never Lies", "Now Those Days Are Gone" and "Easy Love" were released on The Lost Masters compilation. Two years later saw a follow-up, which featured an alternate recording of "Another Night" and remixes of "Easy Love" and "The Land of Make Believe".

Critical reception 
Although Bucks Fizz generally faced harsh criticism in the press for being a lightweight pop act, their albums usually met with favourable response. Are You Ready in particular received some of their best ever reviews.

Smash Hits gave the album a rare 10 out of 10 rating, saying that "[The hits] are overshadowed by the new material which demonstrates surprising versatility. "Are You Ready" and "Twentieth Century Hero" are obvious future hits, although one of the ballads "Now Those Days Are Gone" could easily combine a new credibility with chart success. Almost the perfect pop album". Album track "Twentieth Century Hero" was listed by another staff writer as the best song of the month. Record Mirrors Daniella Soave, who had reviewed their debut album less than favourably said that this was a big improvement. She complimented both the group on outstanding vocal performances and Andy Hill for production values. Both "Love Dies Hard" and "Now Those Days Are Gone" got favourable mentions, while "Easy Love" was "a surprise" and "Breaking and Entering was "tremendous and inventive". Reviewing the album in The Daily Express, writer David Wigg said "[Producer] Andy Hill can take a common everyday phrase and turn it into an infectious tune, dressed up with breathy harmonies and expansive production. The driving "Another Night" or "Are You Ready" are perfect examples of this technique. Nothing is spared to give the production zest". Continuing to give most credit to Hill, The Sunday Times said "Andy Hill's catchy arrangements and slick production have produced a very fine album...[Aside from the singles] there are quite a few more excellent tracks, especially "Another Night" and "20th Century Hero", while "Now Those Days Are Gone" suggests that the group's vocal talent is a lot stronger than many of us imagined". Ireland's RTÉ Guide said of the album; "Some [songs] would never survive as singles but one or two are pretty excellent tracks – "Twentieth Century Hero" is a case in point" and summed the album up as "Good, straightforward pop music". In the US and Canada, eight tracks from this album were issued on their debut self-titled album in September 1982, including the single "The Land of Make Believe". The Montreal Gazette praised the album highly in a review titled "Bucks Fizz album gets top marks", commending the group on their vocal abilities and calling it "high grade British pop".

On the 2000 re-release Q Magazine stated that the album was "harmless fluff" and gave the album a 2 out of 5 rating, but singled out "The Land of Make Believe" as being "not half bad". "The Land of Make Believe" itself was later credited in Number One Magazine as "sheer genius". In 2017, Classic Pop magazine said that Are You Ready was the group's best album, saying that it was "a giant leap in sonic sophistication", calling "My Camera Never Lies", "Easy Love" and "Breaking and Entering" "excellent".

Members Cheryl Baker and Bobby G both rate "The Land of Make Believe" as the best of their own songs. While future members Shelley Preston and Heidi Manton both list album track "Love Dies Hard" as their favourite Bucks Fizz song, and is also mentioned by Jay Aston along with "Easy Love" as among her favourites. More recently, Baker has stated that track "Breaking and Entering" is one of her favourite Bucks Fizz songs. Baker has also stated that Are You Ready is their best album.

Track listing

1982 vinyl release
All songs produced by Andy Hill.

2000 CD re-issue

2004 CD re-issue

Personnel 

Bobby G – lead vocals on "Love Dies Hard"
Jay Aston – lead vocals on "Easy Love"
Mike Nolan – lead vocals on "Now Those Days Are Gone"
Cheryl Baker – lead vocals on "Now You're Gone"
Musicians
Andy Hill – Producer, Keyboards, Guitar, Backing vocals
 Graham Broad – Drums, Percussion
 Ian Bairnson – Electric Guitars
 Pete Willsher – Steel Guitar
 Nick Ingman – String arrangements
 Bruce Baxter – Brass arrangements
 Nichola Martin – Backing vocals
Production
 Recorded at Mayfair Studios
 Mixed at Mayfair Studios and Marcus Studios
 John Hudson, Brad Davis, Brian Tench, Bobby Parr – Engineers
 Dean Murphy – Executive Producer of 2004 CD re-issue
 Christopher Neil – Producer of "What's Love Got to Do With It" (bonus track)
 Bucks Fizz – Producer of "Takin' Me Higher" (bonus track)
 Brian Tench – Producer of "One Touch (Don't Mean Devotion)" and "Censored" (bonus tracks)
Live tracks recorded at the Apollo Theatre, Glasgow, 4 March 1983

Chart performance

References 

1982 albums
Bucks Fizz albums
RCA Records albums